The Albion Carpet Mill, also known as the Bromley Mills, is a former mill in Philadelphia, Pennsylvania, United States, for producing ingrain and damask carpet.

Various members of the Bromley family were associated with Philadelphia's carpet industry. By 1882, James A. and George D. Bromley were producing the more common ingrain and damask carpets at their Albion Carpet Mill on the northwest corner of East Hagert and Jasper Streets. The firm had 350 employees at 140 looms.

A six-story brick building with a decorated and corbelled brick cornice and arched window openings still stands. Adjoining the east side of the mill on the corner sits a one-story warehouse.

References

 Blodget, Lorin. “The Wool Manufacture of Philadelphia,” National Association of Wool Manufacturers Bulletin, 10:1(1880).

Buildings and structures in Philadelphia
Buildings and structures completed in 1882
National Register of Historic Places in Pennsylvania